Jose "Joey" Alberto Oliveira Melo (born January 25, 1989) is a former Canadian professional soccer player.

Club career 
Melo played youth soccer with Dixie SC.

Melo began his professional career in 2007 after signing a contract with Toronto FC of the Major League Soccer. He made his professional debut on June 17, 2007 as a 92nd-minute substitute against FC Dallas. He made five substitute appearances in 2007 and also played in friendly matches against Portuguese club Benfica and English club Aston Villa, but did not make any league appearances in 2008. Toronto declined to exercise his contract option for the 2009 season.

In February 2009, he went on trial with USL club Vancouver Whitecaps FC. In 2010, he appeared with the Toronto FC Reserves in the MLS Reserve League.

In 2010, he went abroad to England to sign with Havant & Waterlooville F.C.

In 2011, he returned to Canada to sign with the Mississauga Eagles FC of the Canadian Soccer League. He helped Mississauga secure a postseason berth, by finishing seventh in the overall standings. In 2012, he was appointed the team captain. In 2013, after the folding of Mississauga, the roster was merged to the North York Astros, known as Astros Vasas FC, with whom he played for.

After North York left the CSL in 2015, he signed with expansion franchise Scarborough SC.

In 2016, he played with North Mississauga SC in League1 Ontario. In his debut season with Mississauga he was selected to the L1O West All-Star team. In 2017 and 2018, he played with Master's Futbol in League1 Ontario.

International career
In 2004, he attended a Canada U15 camp.

He made his international debut with the Canada U17 on April 16, 2005 against Scotland.

References

External links
 
 
 

1989 births
Canadian Soccer League (1998–present) players
Canadian soccer players
Canadian expatriate soccer players
Living people
Major League Soccer players
League1 Ontario players
North York Astros players
Soccer people from Ontario
Toronto FC players
Havant & Waterlooville F.C. players
Sportspeople from Milton, Ontario
Mississauga Eagles FC players
Scarborough SC players
Association football midfielders
Master's FA players
North Mississauga SC players
National League (English football) players